Johan Hove (born 7 September 2000) is a Norwegian professional footballer who plays as a midfielder for Eredivisie club Groningen.

Club career

Sogndal
Hove progressed through the Sogndal youth academy. On 8 May 2016, he made his debut in Eliteserien, coming on as a substitute for Ole Amund Sveen in the 4–1 win away over Aalesunds FK. On 19 April 2018, he signed a contract extension keeping him at Sogndal until 31 December 2020.

Strømsgodset
On 14 August 2018, Hove signed with Strømsgodset on a one-and-a-half-year deal. He was assigned the number 8 shirt. On 26 August, he made his debut, coming on as a substitute for Herman Stengel in a 4–3 loss to Rosenborg.

Hove made his first goal in the Norwegian top division, in the 3–2 win over Haugesund on 31 March 2019. On 18 December 2019, Hove renewed his contract with Strømsgodset until 30 June 2022. The parties further extended the existing agreement on 21 September 2020, until 30 June 2023.

Groningen 
On 17 January 2023, Hove officially joined Eredivisie side Groningen, signing a contract until June 2026 with the Dutch club.

International career
Hove represented Norway at various national youth levels. He made his debut for the Norway under-21 team on 10 September 2019, replacing Tobias Heintz in a 3–0 victory over Hungary, in a friendly played in Felcsút.

Career statistics

Club

References

External links 

 

2000 births
Living people
Norwegian footballers
Norway youth international footballers
Norway under-21 international footballers
Eliteserien players
Eredivisie players
Sogndal Fotball players
Strømsgodset Toppfotball players
FC Groningen players
Association football midfielders
People from Sogndal
Sportspeople from Vestland
Expatriate footballers in the Netherlands
Norwegian expatriate footballers
Norwegian expatriate sportspeople in the Netherlands